This list consists of fictional medical examiners from various works of literature, films, video game, and television series, in order of their show/book debut.

External links

Medical examiners
List